This is a list of flag bearers who have represented Uzbekistan at the Olympics.

Flag bearers carry the national flag of their country at the opening ceremony of the Olympic Games.

See also
Uzbekistan at the Olympics

References

Uzbekistan at the Olympics
Uzbekistan
Olympic flagbearers